Sin-é (from the Irish phrase  meaning "that's it") was a music venue in New York City that helped launch the careers of several noted musicians in the early 1990s.

History

Original café
The original Sin-é, located at 122 St. Mark's Place in Manhattan's East Village, was a small café that served food, coffee, and Rolling Rock beer. It was opened by Irish immigrant Shane Doyle in 1989. The early days saw a number of poetry readings and acoustic sessions. One group that began to attracted a wider audience on Saturday nights was The Clumsy Cabaret, a late-night gathering that drew musicians (including many of New York's anti-folk scene) after gigs. Acoustic music sessions took place in a spontaneous and creative atmosphere. Patrons included emerging writers, photographers, artists, designers and musicians. Later, as a more established venue, performers played for tips.

Seasoned performers such as Sinéad O'Connor, Jeff Buckley, October Project, Marianne Faithfull, Shane MacGowan, Hothouse Flowers, The Waterboys, Allen Ginsberg, Susan McKeown, Star Drooker and the band Native Tongue also appeared at Sin-é, giving impromptu performances. The stage was an area where tables were cleared away against a wall.

The informal atmosphere and regular audience were instrumental in creating a fertile musical scene that flourished until Sin-é closed in 1996. Jeff Buckley's first release was the EP Live at Sin-é (1993), while a double album, Live at Sin-é (Legacy Edition), was released in 2003.

Legendary NYC jug band, Porkchop, was featured on Saturday nights. The band included Chris Lafrenz on mandolin and vocals, animation icons Mike DeSeve (accordion/vocals) and Brian Mulroney (washboard/vocals), and Strokes guru J.P. Bowersock on guitar.

Second incarnation
In 2000, Doyle opened a 380-capacity version of Sin-é on North Eighth Street just off of Bedford Avenue in Williamsburg, Brooklyn. Due to problems with the city and complaints by nearby residents, the club closed after only a few months.

Final venue
Located at 150 Attorney Street, at the corner of Stanton Street on the Lower East Side of Manhattan, the last Sin-é was named "Best New Venue" in NY Magazine's "Best of New York" issue of March 2003. On its first birthday, Sin-é was awarded "Best Place to See a Local Band's First Gig" by NY Magazine (March 2004) for helping nurture acts like The Seconds and The Secret Machines.

In 2004, the adjoining Sin-e Bar opened by Doyle and two others. The venue and bar closed on April 2, 2007, reportedly due to the area's gentrification.

References

Sources
 Browne, David. Dream Brother: The Lives and Music of Jeff and Tim Buckley. HarperEntertainment: 2001, 2002; 
 Jeff Buckley Sin-é FAQ
 Wall, Eamonn (2000). From the Sin-e Cafe to the Black Hills. University of Wisconsin Press. pp. 61–64

Music venues completed in 1989
2007 disestablishments in New York (state)
Lower East Side
Cultural history of New York City
Former music venues in New York City
East Village, Manhattan
1989 establishments in New York City